Fujian Ningde Funing Football Club was a professional Chinese football club. The team was based in Ningde, Fujian.

History
The club was formed by Shen Wence in 2005 as an amateur football club. It took part in amateur football league in Fuzhou for years. On January 16, 2017 the club officially converted into a professional team when it aimed for the qualification to the China League Two. In the 2017 season Zhao Tuqiang was appointed as the head coach. After winning the champion of 2017 Fujian Football Super League, the club enter into the second round of CAL, and managed to qualify for the third round. In the knockout stage, the club beat Wuhan Chufeng Heli, but after being defeated by Qiqihaer Zhongjian Bituminous Concrete and Yanbian Beiguo, the club eventually ranked 7th in the 2017 CAL. However, the club was substituted to promote to the China League Two, due to the withdrawal of Zhaoqing Hengtai, Chengdu Qbao and Shanghai JuJu Sports, as well as Qiqihaer Zhongjian Bituminous Concrete and Lhasa Urban Construction Investment being ineligible for promotion.
On March 5, 2019, the club switched its home ground from Fuzhou, Fujian to Jinjiang, Fujian.

On February 3, 2020, the club was disqualified for 2020 China League Two after they failed to submit the salary and bonus confirmation form. On May 15 the club announced that it had solved its financial problems, moved to Ningde and renamed Fujian Ningde Funing F.C., but it failed to regain the entrance to 2020 China League Two and was soon dissolved afterwards.

Managerial history
  Zhao Tuqiang (2017–2020)

Results
All-time league rankings

As of the end of 2019 season.

 In group stage.

Key
<div>

 Pld = Played
 W = Games won
 D = Games drawn
 L = Games lost
 F = Goals for
 A = Goals against
 Pts = Points
 Pos = Final position

 DNQ = Did not qualify
 DNE = Did not enter
 NH = Not Held
 – = Does Not Exist
 R1 = Round 1
 R2 = Round 2
 R3 = Round 3
 R4 = Round 4

 F = Final
 SF = Semi-finals
 QF = Quarter-finals
 R16 = Round of 16
 Group = Group stage
 GS2 = Second Group stage
 QR1 = First Qualifying Round
 QR2 = Second Qualifying Round
 QR3 = Third Qualifying Round

References

Association football clubs established in 2005
Association football clubs disestablished in 2020
2005 establishments in China
2020 disestablishments in China